Balool, or (Balool y Madi), (Kurdish: Balûl or Balûli Madî) was a 9th century Kurdish poet and religious scholar of the Yarsani faith, who wrote poems in the Gorani and Southern dialects of the Kurdish language. His poems are considered to be one of the earliest examples of Kurdish literature and poetry. Balool and his fellow poet companions, including Baba Najoom, Baba Lura and Baba Rajab, all took a vital role in the revival and "renaissance" of the Yarsani faith.

References

Kurdish literature